nav/attack is an electronic music project from Los Angeles founded by Alaskan-born Andrew Lynch (singer-songwriter). Its eponymous debut album was released on October 2, 2015 on Dangerbird Records with music videos starring Adam Goldberg.

Lynch has stated that the music of nav/attack is heavily influenced by European Arthouse cinema.

Song Releases 
 A Different Here [Andrew Lynch] 4:21:00
 More Wins [Andrew Lynch] 3:53:00
 Tear It [Andrew Lynch] 3:30
 Default [Andrew Lynch] 5:02
 Like Someone In His Place[Andrew Lynch] 3:48
 Gimme Back [Andrew Lynch] 4:36
 NewsBreak [Andrew Lynch] 3:18
 Factory Life [Andrew Lynch] 3:54
 Clear As Clouds [Andrew Lynch] 3:54
 Somewhere [Andrew Lynch] 5:19

References

External links

 – official site
nav/attack at Dangerbird Records

American electronic musicians